Vermont station may refer to:

Rail stations in Los Angeles

 Expo/Vermont station
 Vermont/Beverly station
 Vermont/Athens station
 Vermont/Santa Monica station
 Vermont/Sunset station
 Wilshire/Vermont station

Radio stations in Vermont

 List of radio stations in Vermont